This is a list of the songs that reached number one in Argentina in 1964, according to Billboard magazine with data provided by Rubén Machado's "Escalera a la fama".

See also
1964 in music

References

Sources
Print editions of the Billboard magazine.

1964 in Argentina
Argentina
1964